Egotrippi is a Finnish pop group, founded in the early 1990s. Among their hits are "Älä koskaan ikinä", which is featured on the soundtrack of the Finnish movie Nousukausi (2003), "Unihiekkaa" and "Matkustaja", which reached #11 on the Finnish Top 20 and featured on the soundtrack of the movie Kukkia ja sidontaa (2004).

Discography
 Egotrippi 1995
 Superego 1997
 Alter Ego 1998
 Helsinki-Hollola 2000
 Moulaa! (B -puolia ja harvinaisuuksia) 2001
 Matkustaja 2003
 20 Suosikkia (kokoelma) 2004
 Vielä koittaa uusi aika 2006
 Maailmanloppua odotellessa 2008
 Pilvien alla, maan päällä 2013
 Vuosi Nolla 2015
 10 2017

External links 

Finnish musical groups